Melanesian Pidgin or Neo-Melanesian language comprises four related English-derived languages of Melanesia:

 Bislama, of Vanuatu
 Solomon Islands Pidgin
 Tok Pisin, of Papua New Guinea
 Torres Strait Creole, of the Torres Strait Islands and parts of Cape York
These languages are linked to workers from these places working on plantations in the Australian state of Queensland. Torres Strait Creole is the least closely related of the four.

See also
 Micronesian Pidgin English, spoken in nineteenth-century Micronesia
 Pidgin (disambiguation)